The Bendigo Weekly is a tabloid-size, full-colour newspaper published weekly throughout Bendigo, and country districts in central Victoria, including Woodend, Echuca, Wedderburn and Colbinabbin.

The paper has won many awards, including a Walkley Award by journalist Anthony Radford for Suburban and Regional Affairs. Radford also was the recipient of a Quill Award for Best Regional or Rural Affairs Report in 2007.

Victorian Country Press Awards for a paper with circulation greater than 10,000 include: Journalism 2006, 2007 and 2008; Local Reporting 2006, 2007 and 2008; Best Use of Colour 2007; Best Photographic Study 2008; Best News Photograph 2008; and Overall Newspaper Excellence 2008.

The awards won in 2006 relate specifically to the paper's coverage of the water crisis confronting Bendigo. At the time, a decade of drought had depleted the city's reservoirs to the point where supplies were likely to run out by year's end. 

In 2009 the paper commenced a campaign to promote the building of a new Bendigo hospital.

In September 2019, it was announced the paper would cease publication as a separate entity and absorbed by the Bendigo Advertiser which aims to boost poor circulation figures of the latter masthead.

References

External links
Official website

Bendigo
Newspapers published in Victoria (Australia)
Mass_media_in_Bendigo
Weekly newspapers published in Australia